Idrissa Thiam (born 2 September 2000) is a Mauritanian professional footballer who plays as a right winger for Spanish club Polvorín FC.

Club career
Born in Sebkha, Thiam represented ASAC Concorde as a youth. On 2 September 2019, he moved abroad and joined Cádiz CF on loan for one year, and was initially assigned to the reserves in Segunda División B.

On 25 January 2022, Thiam's loan with Cádiz was cut short, and he signed for fellow third division side SCR Peña Deportiva on 11 February. He left the latter club in March, without debuting, after his parent club registered him back on the squad.

On 30 January 2022, Thiam signed a two-year contract with CD Lugo, being initially assigned to the farm team.

International career
In October 2020, Thiam was called up by Mauritania national team manager Corentin Martins for two friendly matches against Sierra Leone and Senegal. He made his full international debut on 9 October, coming on as a second-half substitute for Almike N'Diaye and providing the assist for Hemeya Tanjy's winning goal in a 2–1 victory over the former.

References

External links

2000 births
Living people
Mauritanian footballers
Association football wingers
Segunda División players
Segunda División B players
Segunda Federación players
Tercera Federación players
Cádiz CF B players
SCR Peña Deportiva players
Polvorín FC players
CD Lugo players
Mauritania international footballers
Mauritanian expatriate footballers
Mauritanian expatriate sportspeople in Spain
Expatriate footballers in Spain
2021 Africa Cup of Nations players